Hohlstedt is a former municipality in the Weimarer Land district of Thuringia, Germany. Since 1 December 2007, it is part of the municipality Großschwabhausen.

Former municipalities in Thuringia
Grand Duchy of Saxe-Weimar-Eisenach